Two Kinds of Love is a 1920 American silent Western film directed by B. Reeves Eason and starring George A. McDaniel, Ted Brooks, Jimsy Maye, B. Reeves Eason Jr., and B. Reeves Eason. The film was released by Universal Film Manufacturing Company in December 1920.

Cast
 George A. McDaniel as Mason
 Ted Brooks as Fred Watson
 Jimsy Maye as Kate Watson
 B. Reeves Eason Jr. as Bobby Watson
 B. Reeves Eason as Dorgan (as Reeves Eason)
 Fontaine La Rue as Sita
 Charles Newton as Jim Morley

Preservation
The film is now considered lost.

References

External links
 

1920 films
1920 Western (genre) films
1920 lost films
American black-and-white films
Films directed by B. Reeves Eason
Lost American films
Lost Western (genre) films
Silent American Western (genre) films
Universal Pictures films
1920s American films